Glyphipterix pyrogastra is a species of sedge moth in the genus Glyphipterix. It was described by Edward Meyrick in 1909. It is found in India (Assam).

References

Moths described in 1909
Glyphipterigidae
Moths of Asia